Gianluigi Saccaro (29 December 1938 – 17 February 2021) was an Italian fencer. Saccaro won a gold medal at the 1960 Summer Olympics, a silver at the 1964 Games and a bronze at the 1968 Games. He also competed at the 1972 Olympics, both individually and with the Italian team, but failed to reach the finals.

References

External links
 

1938 births
2021 deaths
Italian male fencers
Olympic fencers of Italy
Fencers at the 1960 Summer Olympics
Fencers at the 1964 Summer Olympics
Fencers at the 1968 Summer Olympics
Fencers at the 1972 Summer Olympics
Olympic gold medalists for Italy
Olympic silver medalists for Italy
Olympic bronze medalists for Italy
Olympic medalists in fencing
Fencers from Milan
Medalists at the 1960 Summer Olympics
Medalists at the 1964 Summer Olympics
Medalists at the 1968 Summer Olympics
Universiade medalists in fencing
Universiade bronze medalists for Italy
Medalists at the 1959 Summer Universiade
Medalists at the 1963 Summer Universiade